Athenian Seafood Restaurant and Bar, or simply The Athenian, is a seafood restaurant in Seattle's Pike Place Market, in the U.S. state of Washington. The business was established in 1909, and became one of Seattle's first to acquire a beer license in 1933. The Athenian appeared in Sleepless in Seattle. In addition to seafood, the menu has included burgers and salads.

See also 

 List of seafood restaurants

References

External links
 
 
 The Athenian Seafood Restaurant and Bar at Pike Place Market

1909 establishments in Washington (state)
Pike Place Market
Restaurants established in 1909
Seafood restaurants in Seattle
Central Waterfront, Seattle